Alain Prost is a French former racing driver who won four Formula One World Championships. He entered Formula One in the 1980 season with McLaren, but moved to Renault after one season, breaking his two-year contract. He spent three seasons at Renault, but fell out with the team, which he felt had blamed him for their failure to win a world championship, and returned to McLaren in  missing out on the world championship by half a point to his teammate Niki Lauda. In , Ayrton Senna joined McLaren as Prost's teammate, and the pair developed an intense rivalry which featured race incidents and collisions occurring between the two. He missed out on the world championship that season after Senna intentionally crashed into him during the penultimate race of the year.

Prost achieved his first victory in Formula One on home soil the 1981 French Grand Prix on 5 July. His second win, at the  later that season, was described as one of his best according to Graham Keilloh of Motor Sport magazine, who said he "was faultless under the most pitiless pressure." He won nine races during his three seasons with Renault, and won a record-equalling seven races during his first season back with McLaren, when he missed out on the Formula One world championship by half a point from his teammate Niki Lauda. Over the next two seasons, he won nine races as he won back-to-back championship titles, and in  he set a new record for the most Grand Prix wins, passing Jackie Stewart's total of 27. In  he was once again the championship runner-up, despite winning seven races, establishing an intense rivalry with his teammate, Ayrton Senna. Prost won four times in 1989 as he claimed the world championship for the third time, and then won five races the following season with Ferrari. The 1991 season was the first since his debut year in 1980 that Prost did not achieve a race win. After missing the 1992 season, Prost won seven races in 1993 to claim his fourth world championship. His final win in Formula One came at the 1993 German Grand Prix.

In all, Prost won 51 Grands Prix at 24 different circuits, currently ranking him fourth in the all-time Formula One Grand Prix winners' list. He was most successful at Silverstone and Jacarepaguá, winning five times at both. The majority of his wins (31) were for McLaren; he also won 9 races with Renault, 7 for Williams and 5 with Ferrari. His most successful races were the Brazilian and French Grands Prix, each of which he won six times.

Wins
Key:
 No. – Victory number; for example, "1" signifies Prost's first race win.
 Race – Race number; for example, "1" signifies the first race Prost took part in. Races in which Prost unsuccessfully attempted to qualify are included.
 Grid – The position on the grid at which Prost started the race.
 Margin – Margin of victory, given in the format of minutes:seconds.milliseconds
  – Driver's Championship winning season.

Number of wins at different Grands Prix

Number of wins at different circuits

See also
 List of Formula One Grand Prix winners

References

External links 
 Drivers: Hall of Fame: Alain Prost
 Alain Prost: Involvement from Stats F1

1980s in motorsport
1980s-related lists
1990s in motorsport
1990s-related lists
Prost
Formula One Grand Prix wins